Devia is a genus of rove beetles in the family Staphylinidae. There are at least two described species in Devia.

Species
These two species belong to the genus Devia:
 Devia congruens (Casey, 1893) i c g b
 Devia prospera (Erichson, 1839) i c g
Data sources: i = ITIS, c = Catalogue of Life, g = GBIF, b = Bugguide.net

References

Further reading

External links

 

Aleocharinae
Articles created by Qbugbot